Maharashtra State Highway 245 (SH 245), is a state highway in Wardha District and Nagpur District, in the state of Maharashtra.  This state highway touches Karanja, Lohari Sawanga , Bharsinghi, Jalalkheda, Mowad, up to Madhya Pradesh border connecting with MSH 10 at Bangoan near Pandhurna in Madhya Pradesh. Hence it provides connectivity with NH 53 to NH 47.

Summary 

This road is one of the important roads in Nagpur District and Wardha District providing connectivity with NH-6 and NH 69

Major junctions 

This highway started from the intersection at Karanja town with National Highway 53 (India)( NH6 old numbering) and end at Bangoan village in Madhya Pradesh connecting with MSH 10 near Maharashtra border, in Chhindwara District.

Connections 
Many villages, cities and towns in Nagpur District and Wardha District are connecting by this state highway.
Karanja 
Lohari Sawanga
Bharsinghi
Jalalkheda
Mowad

See also 
 List of State Highways in Maharashtra

References 

State Highways in Maharashtra
State Highways in Nagpur District